Lasiocampa is a genus of moths in the family Lasiocampidae. The genus was described by Franz von Paula Schrank in 1802.

Species
Based on Lepidoptera and Some Other Life Forms:
Lasiocampa trifolii (Denis & Schiffermüller, 1775) - grass eggar - northern Africa, Europe, Asia Minor, Iran, Turkmenistan, Kazakhstan
Lasiocampa quercus (Linnaeus, 1758) - oak eggar - Canary Islands, Europe, Asia Minor, Caucasia, Russia, Altai
Lasiocampa grandis (Rogenhofer, 1891) Greece, Macedonia, Asia Minor, Iran, Iraq, Syria, Palestine, Egypt, Armenia
Lasiocampa piontkovskii Sheljuzhko, 1943 Transcaucasia
Lasiocampa eversmanni (Eversmann, 1843) southeastern Europe, southern Russia, Ural, southern Altai, Asia Minor, Caucasus, Iraq, Iran, Afghanistan
Lasiocampa nana Staudinger, 1887 Alai, Kopet Dagh
Lasiocampa serrula (Guenée, 1858) Spain, northern Africa, Palestine
Lasiocampa decolorata (Klug, 1832) Morocco, Egypt, Sudan, Palestine
Lasiocampa staudingeri (Baker, 1885) northern Africa

References

Lasiocampidae
Taxa named by Franz von Paula Schrank